Rossian or Russian colony  is an unincorporated community in Alberta, Canada within Lac La Biche County that is recognized as a designated place by Statistics Canada.

Demographics 

As a designated place in the 2011 Census, Rossian had a population of 132 living in 30 of its 34 total dwellings, a 51.7% change from its 2006 population of 87.

Rossian has been populated by Old Believers since the 1970s.

See also 
List of communities in Alberta

References 

Former designated places in Alberta
Localities in Lac La Biche County